Picture World is an Iranian film magazine published monthly by Donyaye Tassvir Publication in Tehran, Iran. It was founded in 1992 by Ali Moallem. From the first issue in February 1993 until issue No. 272 in March 2017, the magazine was edited by Ali Moallem. After his death in March, it is published by his son, Omid Moallem.

In March 2008 Picture World was temporarily closed by the Press Monitoring Committee of Iran. The magazine organizes the Hafez Awards.

See also
Hafez Awards

References

External links

1992 establishments in Iran
Film magazines published in Iran
Magazines established in 1992
Magazines published in Tehran
Monthly magazines published in Iran
Persian-language magazines